Badghis University is located in  Badghis province, Afghanistan.

Departments of Faculty of Education

See also 
List of universities in Afghanistan

References

Universities in Afghanistan
University